Weinmannia trichosperma, the tineo, is an evergreen  tree in the family of Cunoniaceae, it is native to Chile and Argentina: 35 to 47°S. endemic to laurel forest habitat.

Description
Weinmannia trichosperma grows up to 30 m (100 ft) high. It has a straight trunk up to 1 m (3 ft) in diameter and gray, fissured bark. The leaves are imparipinnate and opposite. Between the leaflets there are triangular wings giving each pair a rhomboid outline. There are two deciduous stipules at the base of the leaves. The leaves are about 3–8 cm long and  2–4 cm wide, and the leaflets are 0.6–1.6 cm long and 0.6–1.0 cm wide and toothed. The foliage tends to be sparse and spread out.

The flowers are hermaphrodite, small, white and clustered in racemes. The calyx is made up of 4–5 imbricate sepals; the corolla has 3–5 composite petals; the androecium has 8-10 stamens; the gynoecium has a superior ovary with 2 carpels and white stigmas.

The fruit is a leathery obovate capsule  which is divided in two. In autumn the capsule turns bright red, and is 6–9 mm long and 2 mm wide. It opens in the middle between the styles. The seeds are ellipsoid, light brown, with scattered white hairs and small: 1 mm long and 0.6 mm wide.

Cultivation and uses
The bark can be used to tan leather. W.  trichosperma is used as an ornamental tree in Chile. The flowers are used by introduced European bees to make a delicious honey. The wood is hard and exhibits a vivid grain pattern of darker and lighter colouration, making it highly prized for decorative uses. It thrives in cool and moist climates, and it succeeds as an ornamental in Northern Ireland, Scotland, some parts of England and in the North Pacific Coast of the United States.

Etymology
Weinmannia, for German botanist J. A. Weinmann  (1782–1858); trichosperma, from Latin: hairy seeds. And tineo, Mapuche name.

References and external links

Donoso, C. 2005. Árboles nativos de Chile. Guía de reconocimiento. Edición 4. Marisa Cuneo Ediciones, Valdivia, Chile. 136 p.
Hoffmann, A. 1982. Flora silvestre de Chile, Zona Araucana. Edición 4. Fundación Claudio Gay, Santiago. 258 p.

trichosperma
Flora of the Andes
Flora of central Chile
Trees of Chile
Trees of Argentina
Trees of mild maritime climate
Flora of the Valdivian temperate rainforest
Garden plants of South America
Ornamental trees
Taxa named by Antonio José Cavanilles